Billingsgate Fish Market is located in Poplar in London. It is the United Kingdom's largest inland fish market. It takes its name from Billingsgate, a ward in the south-east corner of the City of London, where the riverside market was originally established. In its original location in the 19th century, Billingsgate was the largest fish market in the world.

History

City of London

Billingsgate Wharf, close to Lower Thames Street, became the centre of a fish market during the 16th and 17th centuries but did not become formally established until an Act of Parliament in 1699.

In 1850, the market, according to Horace Jones, "consisted only of shed buildings ... The open space on the north of the well-remembered Billingsgate Dock was dotted with low booths and sheds, with a range of wooden houses with a piazza in front on the west, which served the salesmen and fishmongers as shelter, and for the purposes of carrying on their trade." In that year the market was rebuilt to a design by J. B. Bunning, the City architect.

Bunning's building was soon found to be insufficient for the increased trade, and in 1872 the Corporation obtained an Act to rebuild and enlarge the market, which was done to plans by Bunning's successor as City architect Sir Horace Jones. The new site covered almost twice the area of the old, incorporating Billingsgate Stairs and Wharf and Darkhouse Lane. Work began in 1874, and the new market was opened by the Lord Mayor on 20 July 1877. The new buildings,  Italianate in style, had on their long frontages towards Thames Street the river, a pedimented centre and continuous arcade, flanked at each end by a pavilion tavern. Electric lighting was also furnished in November 1878 via 16 Jablochkoff Candles.

The opening of the railways changed the nature of the trade, and by the late nineteenth century most of the fish arrived at the market via the Great Eastern Railway.

The infamously coarse language of London fishmongers made "Billingsgate" a byword for crude or vulgar language. One of its earliest uses can be seen in a 1577 chronicle by Raphael Holinshed, where the writer makes reference to the foul tongues of Billingsgate oyster-wives. The market is depicted during Tudor times in Rosemary Sutcliff's 1951 children's historical novel The Armourer's House. The writer George Orwell worked at Billingsgate in the 1930s, as did the Kray twins in the 1950s.

Poplar
In 1982, the fish market was relocated to a new  building complex on the Isle of Dogs in Poplar, close to Canary Wharf and Blackwall. The freehold owner of the site is the London Borough of Tower Hamlets, but the City of London Corporation still runs the market; they pay an annual ground rent stipulated in an agreement between the two councils as "the gift of one fish". Most of the fish sold through the market now arrives there by road, from ports as far afield as Aberdeen and Cornwall.

Billingsgate Market is open from Tuesday to Saturday. Trading commences at 4 a.m. and finishes at 8:30 a.m. Security for the market is provided by the private Market Constabulary.

Traditionally, the only people allowed to move fish around the market were licensed fish porters. The role dates back at least to Henry VIII, and was officially recognised by the Corporation of London in 1632. In 2012, a bitter battle was fought between modernisers and traditionalists. The modernists won and the role of the porters ended.

Future
In early 2019, it was proposed in plans put forward by the Court of Common Council, the City of London Corporation’s main decision-making body, that Billingsgate Fish Market, New Spitalfields Market, and Smithfield Market would move to a new consolidated site in Dagenham Dock, and received outline permission in March 2021.

See also
 Worshipful Company of Fishmongers

References

External links 
 Official Billingsgate Market page from the City of London Corporation website
 Old official page

Buildings and structures in the London Borough of Tower Hamlets
Fish markets
Fishing in the United Kingdom
History of the City of London
Poplar, London
Wholesale markets in London